"Hot Sauce" is a song recorded by South Korean boy group NCT Dream for their first studio album of the same name. It was released digitally on May 10, 2021, by SM Entertainment. It became the first trilingual song to enter the Billboard Global 200.

Composition 
"Hot Sauce" was composed by Martin Wave, Tinashe Sibanda, Philip Kembo, Rosina "Soaky Siren" Russell, John Mitchell, Ninos Hanna, Yoo Young-jin, while production was handled by Lee Soo-man. Musically, the song is described as "Latin music with Afrobeat-tinged hip-hop song". It features a "minimal track contrast with repetitive chanting and chilling vibes in the chorus". The track was composed in the key of F-sharp major, with a tempo of 100 beats per minute.

Critical reception 
Kim Sung-yeop of IZM noted the song as it "expresses only the passionate energy and playful, kitsch charm of NCT Dream", adding that it does not match any of the group's existing styles and has a clear presence as the first song to mark a new beginning. Rhian Daly of NME described the track as "vibrant and exuberant", further adding that "the very SM experimentalism that courses through it elevates it into something more weighty and developed".

Commercial performance 
"Hot Sauce" debuted at number one on South Korea's Gaon Digital Chart with chart issue dated May 9–15, 2021, giving the group their first number-one song on the chart. It also debuted atop the Download Chart and BGM Chart. The song debuted at number 37 on the component Streaming Chart, and peaked at number 31. The song entered the Billboard K-Pop Hot 100 at number 39, and peaked at number 18.

In the United States, "Hot Sauce" debuted at number eight on the Billboard World Digital Song Sales. The single debuted at number 96 on the Billboard Global 200 making it the first song in three languages to enter the chart. The song also debuted at number 51 on the Billboard Global Excl. US.

On the year-end charts, Hot Sauce became NCT Dream and NCT's first entry on the yearly Gaon Digital Chart.

Music video 
The music video for "Hot Sauce" is set in a taqueria where the group are tasting their own specialty hot sauce and begins pouring the spicy dressing all over their food. Following the music video's release, Gladys Yeo of NME described it as a "vibrant and whimsical video". Tássia Assis of Teen Vogue noted the "psychedelic TV ad-meets-taquería" of the visual. NCT Dream released two dance practice videos on May 23, 2021.

Accolades

Pinkfong version 
Global entertainment company SmartStudy released a Pinkfong-style version of "Hot Sauce" on May 28, 2021, at 7:00PM KST (UTC+09:00). According to the chief executive officer of SmartStudy, Kim Min-seok, said that they "have created a special gift for all families and fans out there, regardless of age", further adding that they are "always looking to create opportunities" where they can bring joy to their fans around the world and across generations. The version features a special episode of NCT Dream appearing as Pinkfong dinosaur characters that crash-landed in the Age of Dinosaurs. Korean and English versions of the animation videos were released.

Credits and personnel 
Credits adapted from the liner notes of Hot Sauce.

Recording

 Recorded and engineered for mix at SM Yellow Tail Studio
 Recorded, digitally edited, engineered for mix, and mixed at SM Booming System
 Mixed at SM Blue Cup Studio

Personnel

 NCT Dream (Mark, Renjun, Jeno, Haechan, Jaemin, Chenle, Jisung)vocals
 Moon Yeo-reumKorean songwriting
 Jo Yoon-kyungKorean songwriting
 Martin Wavecomposition, arrangement
 Tinashe Sibandacomposition
 Philip Kembocomposition
 Rosina "Soaky Siren" Russellcomposition
 John Mitchellcomposition
 Ninos Hannacomposition
 Yoo Young-jincomposition, arrangement, vocal directing, recording, digital editing, mixing engineer
 Bantuarrangement
 Dr. Chaiiarrangement
 Kenzievocal directing
 Haechanbackground vocals
 Renjunbackground vocals
 Junnybackground vocals
 No Min-jirecording, mixing engineer
 Jung Yu-radigital editing
 Jeong Eui-seokmixing

Charts

Weekly charts

Monthly charts

Year-end charts

Release history

References 

2021 singles
2021 songs
Gaon Digital Chart number-one singles
NCT Dream songs
SM Entertainment singles
Songs written by Tinashe Sibanda
Songs written by Yoo Young-jin